Scott Newhall (January 21, 1914 – October 26, 1992) was a newspaper editor known for his stewardship of the San Francisco Chronicle.

Early life
Scott Newhall was born on January 21, 1914, into the family that owned the Newhall Land and Farming Company. He grew up in San Rafael, San Francisco, and Berkeley, attending Tamalpais School for Boys, Tamalpais High School, San Rafael Military Academy, and the Webb School of California for boys. In 1933, in the midst of his sophomore year at U.C. Berkeley, he married Ruth Waldo.

Newspaper career
In 1934, Newhall joined the San Francisco Chronicle as a photographer. By 1952—when the Chronicles circulation was 155,000, languishing behind those of the San Francisco Examiner and the San Francisco Call-Bulletin—he was promoted from Sunday editor to executive editor, with the goal of increasing circulation, a goal he achieved by enhancing serious news coverage leavened with zany features and a stable of columnists that included "Dear Abby", Arthur Hoppe, Stanton Delaplane, Charles McCabe, "Count Marco", and Herb Caen. By 1965, the Chronicle had surpassed the competition, with a daily circulation of over 363,000. He left the paper in 1971.

In 1963, he purchased The Newhall Signal, which he sold in 1978, but continued to edit until 1988.

In 2012, he was inducted into the California Newspaper Hall of Fame.

Paddlewheel tug Eppleton Hall

In 1970, Newhall purchased, refurbished, and sailed from England to San Francisco the 1914 River Tyne paddlewheel tug Eppleton Hall, which was donated to the San Francisco Maritime National Historical Park.

1971 San Francisco mayoral campaign
In 1971, Newhall campaigned to become mayor of San Francisco. He came in 5th place, getting 8,704 votes, or 3.44% of total votes cast.

Death
On October 26, 1992, Newhall died at Henry Mayo Newhall Memorial Hospital, which was named after his great-grandfather. He had been suffering from acute pancreatitis. He was 78 years of age.

See also
 Earl Hines, musician, received a piano from Newhall
 Lucius Beebe, writer. Newhall edited one of his books.
 Piru Mansion, restored by Newhall

Citations

Works cited

External links
 Newhall memorial reported in 1992 Los Angeles Times
 Ruth Newhall 2003 obituary in San Francisco Chronicle
 Dolly Rhee 2003 obituary in San Francisco Chronicle
 Hartlaub on the anti-swill campaign in 2013 San Francisco Chronicle
 Changing Times – 2015 San Francisco Chronicle
 2016 San Francisco Chronicle story on "Swill" headline
 
 

1914 births
1992 deaths
Editors of California newspapers
Burials at Cypress Lawn Memorial Park
People from San Rafael, California
People from Berkeley, California
Tamalpais High School alumni